Paul Due (19 May 1889 – 6 July 1972) was a Norwegian footballer. He played in one match for the Norway national football team in 1912.

References

External links
 

1889 births
1972 deaths
Norwegian footballers
Norway international footballers
Sportspeople from Saint Paul, Minnesota
Association football defenders
Lyn Fotball players